Agila may refer to:

Agila I (died 554), Visigothic king
Agila II (died 714), Visigothic king
Agila 2, the first Filipino satellite
Agila (album), a 1996 album by Spanish rock band Extremoduro
Agila (film), a 1980 Philippine film directed by Eddie Romero
Agila (TV series), a 1987 Philippine teledrama series
Agila Town, Benue State, Nigeria
Opel Agila or Vauxhall Agila, a city car

See also
Agila division, the 10th Infantry Division of the Philippine Army
Aguila (disambiguation)